A speakeasy is a saloon, common during Prohibition (1920–1933) in the United States.

Speakeasy may also refer to:

Computers and electronics
SpeakEasy, a software defined radio project of the United States military
Speakeasy (computational environment), a numeric computational environment and programming language
Speakeasy (ISP), a large internet service provider in the USA

Film and TV
Speakeasy (1929 film)
Speakeasy (2002 film), by Brendan Murphy
 Speakeasy (Ireland), a daytime show broadcast in Ireland

Music
The Speakeasy Club, a London club where musicians met and played during the late 1960s and early 1970s
Speakeasy (D.I.G. album), 1995
Speakeasy (Freeze the Atlantic album), 2012
Speakeasy (Stavesacre album), 1999
The Speakeasy (album), a 2010 album by Smoke or Fire
 "Speakeasy" (1994), a  single by Shed Seven

Other uses
Speakeasy Comics, a Canadian comic book company
 Speakeasy (Hong Kong), a type of eatery in modern Hong Kong that does not operate under a restaurant licence, but de facto functioning as a restaurant
Speakeasy Ales and Lagers, a Microbrewery in San Francisco, California
Speakeasy Theaters, a theater that sells beer and wine in Oakland, California